The Kentucky "Miss Basketball" honor recognizes the top female high school basketball player in the state of Kentucky. Due to Kentucky's status as a culturally rich basketball state, Miss Basketball winners are highly coveted student athletes by colleges throughout the United States. Originally, there was only a “Kentucky Mr. Basketball” from 1954 to 1975, until 1976 when they created an award for women as well. The reward is presented by The Kentucky Lions Eye Foundation and is given to senior players that have shown exceptional basketball skills. In the past 45 years, all but 1 of these players has gone on to play basketball in college and 4 of them have been drafted into the WNBA.

After Basketball was invented in 1891 at Springfield college in Massachusetts, it didn't take long for the beloved sport to spread across the nation. From the beginning, both women and men enjoyed playing the sport. At the University of Kentucky, there was a women's basketball team, organized in 1902, before a men's team. Unfortunately, basketball quickly became taboo for women in the 1920s and was even banned in Kentucky high schools and colleges in 1932. That is, until 1974 when Senator Baker passed a bill, later known as Baker's Bill, that if a school has a men's basketball team, they must have a women's team as well.

Award winners

See also
List of Kentucky Mr. Basketball award winners

References
Kentucky Historical Society. (n.d.). Women's Basketball Banned in Kentucky. https://history.ky.gov/pdf/Library/LEGM002-Womens%20Basketball%20in%20Kentucky.pdf. 

Miss Kentucky Basketball History. A Kentucky Tradition Since 1954. (2021, April 21). https://mrandmisskybasketball.com/miss-kentucky-basketball-history/. 

Springfield College. (n.d.). https://springfield.edu/where-basketball-was-invented-the-birthplace-of-basketball. 

Mr. and Miss Basketball awards
Basketball in Kentucky
Awards established in 1976
Women in Kentucky
Basketball players from Kentucky
Miss Basketball
American women's basketball players
Miss Basketball